Gluphisia severa, the banded pebble, is a species of moth in the family Notodontidae (the prominents). It was first described by Henry Edwards in 1886 and it is found in North America.

The MONA or Hodges number for Gluphisia severa is 7935.

References

Further reading

 
 
 

Notodontidae
Articles created by Qbugbot
Moths described in 1886